Diana Rowntree (14 May 1915 – 22 August 2008) was a British architect and architectural writer.

Career and life
After graduating from Somerville College, Oxford and the Architectural Association School of Architecture in 1939, she joined Jane Drew's architecture practice, that at the time worked on a War Office scheme for faux factories designed to divert enemy bombers.

In the mid-1950s Rowntree took on jobs within architectural press, establishing a position as first architectural writer for The Guardian and acting as news editor for the Architectural Design magazine. 

In 1964 she wrote Diana's Interior Design: A Penguin Handbook, called a pioneering work with an emphasis on minimalist rationality by The Guardian post mortem. By the mid-1960s she had resumed her own architectural practice in addition to her writing.

Her husband was painter Kenneth Rowntree, whom she married 1939.

See also
Women in architecture

Further reading
 Rowntree D. (1994). Buildlings Face the Future. Corbridge, UK: ARCHITYPE.

References

1915 births
2008 deaths
Alumni of the Architectural Association School of Architecture
Alumni of Somerville College, Oxford
20th-century British architects
British women architects